is a Japanese freestyle skier. He competed in the men's aerials event at the 1998 Winter Olympics.

References

1967 births
Living people
Japanese male freestyle skiers
Olympic freestyle skiers of Japan
Freestyle skiers at the 1998 Winter Olympics
Sportspeople from Tokyo
20th-century Japanese people